Condor Flugdienst Flight 3782 was an international charter flight from Stuttgart-Echterdingen Airport, West Germany to Adnan Menderes Airport, Turkey that crashed near Seferihisar, Turkey on 2 January 1988. At the time, Condor was a 100% subsidiary of Lufthansa.

Aircraft
The aircraft was a Boeing 737-230 with the serial number 22635/774 and it was registered D-ABHD. Its first flight was on June 15, 1981, and it was delivered in July of the same year to the airline. The aircraft was equipped with 2 Pratt & Whitney JT8D-17A engines.

The captain, Wolfgang Hechler (48), was a former Starfighter pilot. The First Officer was Helmut Zöller (33).

Accident description
The flight was uneventful until final approach, when the aircraft, with the co-pilot acting as Pilot flying, was cleared for an ILS approach to the Outer Marker (Non-Directional Beacon) and then on to Runway 35. The aircraft's ILS was switched on after it had passed the NDB, therefore missing the turn. The crew, confused, then followed the wrong side beam of the ILS, and struck Dümentepe Hill,  from the airport, killing all 16 people on board.

Investigation 
According to the evaluation of the cockpit voice recorder, captain Hechler continuously talked to First Officer Zöller, even in the approach phase and kept on criticising, lambasting and insulting him, partly without reference to duty or work subjects. The investigation concluded that the accident occurred due to the incorrect use of navigation aids. The cause is attributed mainly to the lack of adherence to company procedures, especially with respect to crew coordination during approach and basic instrument flying procedures.

See also
American Airlines Flight 965, another aircraft that crashed due to navigational errors.

References

Airliner accidents and incidents caused by pilot error
Aviation accidents and incidents in 1988
Aviation accidents and incidents in Turkey
Accidents and incidents involving the Boeing 737 Original
1988 in Turkey
History of İzmir Province
January 1988 events in Asia
January 1988 events in Europe
1988 disasters in Turkey